The jaguar (Panthera onca) is a large cat species and the only living member of the genus Panthera native to the Americas. Its distinctively marked coat features pale yellow to tan colored fur covered by spots that transition to rosettes on the sides, although a melanistic black coat appears in some individuals. The jaguar's powerful bite allows it to pierce the carapaces of turtles and tortoises, and to employ an unusual killing method: it bites directly through the skull of mammalian prey between the ears to deliver a fatal blow to the brain.

The modern jaguar's ancestors probably entered the Americas from Eurasia during the Early Pleistocene via the land bridge that once spanned the Bering Strait. Today, the jaguar's range extends from core Southwestern United States across Mexico and much of Central America, the Amazon rainforest and south to Paraguay and northern Argentina. It inhabits a variety of forested and open terrains, but its preferred habitat is tropical and subtropical moist broadleaf forest, wetlands and wooded regions. It is adept at swimming and is largely a solitary, opportunistic, stalk-and-ambush apex predator. As a keystone species, it plays an important role in stabilizing ecosystems and in regulating prey populations.

The jaguar is threatened by habitat loss, habitat fragmentation, poaching for trade with its body parts and killings in human–wildlife conflict situations, particularly with ranchers in Central and South America. It has been listed as Near Threatened on the IUCN Red List since 2002. The wild population is thought to have declined since the late 1990s. Priority areas for jaguar conservation comprise 51 Jaguar Conservation Units (JCUs), defined as large areas inhabited by at least 50 breeding jaguars. The JCUs are located in 36 geographic regions ranging from Mexico to Argentina.

The jaguar has featured prominently in the mythology of indigenous peoples of the Americas, including those of the Aztec and Maya civilizations.

Etymology
The word "jaguar" is possibly derived from the Tupi-Guarani word  meaning 'wild beast that overcomes its prey at a bound'. In North America, the word is pronounced disyllabic , while in British English, it is pronounced with three syllables . Because that word also applies to other animals, indigenous peoples in Guyana call it , with the added sufix eté, meaning "true beast".
"Onca" is derived from the Portuguese name  for a spotted cat that is larger than a lynx; cf. ounce. The word "panther" is derived from classical Latin , itself from the ancient Greek .

Taxonomy and evolution

Taxonomy
In 1758, Carl Linnaeus described the jaguar in his work Systema Naturae and gave it the scientific name Felis onca.
In the 19th and 20th centuries, several jaguar type specimens formed the basis for descriptions of subspecies. In 1939, Reginald Innes Pocock recognized eight subspecies based on the geographic origins and skull morphology of these specimens.
Pocock did not have access to sufficient zoological specimens to critically evaluate their subspecific status but expressed doubt about the status of several. Later consideration of his work suggested only three subspecies should be recognized. The description of P. o. palustris was based on a fossil skull.
By 2005, nine subspecies were considered to be valid taxa.

Reginald Innes Pocock placed the jaguar in the genus Panthera and observed that it shares several morphological features with the leopard (P. pardus). He, therefore, concluded that they are most closely related to each other. Results of morphological and genetic research indicate a clinal north–south variation between populations, but no evidence for subspecific differentiation. DNA analysis of 84 jaguar samples from South America revealed that the gene flow between jaguar populations in Colombia was high in the past. Since 2017, the jaguar is considered to be a monotypic taxon.

Evolution

and the geographic origin of the genus is most likely northern Central Asia.
Some genetic analyses place the jaguar as a sister species to the lion with which it diverged , but other studies place the lion closer to the leopard.

The lineage of the jaguar appears to have originated in Africa and spread to Eurasia 1.95–1.77 mya. The modern species may have descended from Panthera gombaszoegensis, which is thought to have entered the American continent via Beringia, the land bridge that once spanned the Bering Strait. Fossils of modern jaguars have been found in North America dating to over 850,000 years ago. Results of mitochondrial DNA analysis of 37 jaguars indicate that current populations evolved between 510,000 and 280,000 years ago in northern South America and subsequently recolonized North and Central America after the extinction of jaguars there during the Late Pleistocene.

Two extinct subspecies of jaguar are recognized in the fossil record: the North American P. o. augusta and South American P. o. mesembrina.

Description

The jaguar is a compact and well-muscled animal. It is the largest cat native to the Americas and the third largest in the world, exceeded in size only by the tiger and the lion.
It is sexually dimorphic, with females typically being 10–20% smaller than males.
Its muscular legs are shorter than the legs of other Panthera species with similar body weight.

Size is tending to increase from north to south.

The jaguar's coat ranges from pale yellow to tan or reddish-yellow, with a whitish underside and covered in black spots. The spots and their shapes vary: on the sides, they become rosettes which may include one or several dots. The spots on the head and neck are generally solid, as are those on the tail where they may merge to form bands near the end and create a black tip. They are elongated on the middle of the back, often connecting to create a median stripe, and blotchy on the belly. These patterns serve as camouflage in areas with dense vegetation and patchy shadows.
Jaguars living in forests are often darker and considerably smaller than those living in open areas, possibly due to the smaller numbers of large, herbivorous prey in forest areas.

The jaguar closely resembles the leopard but is generally more robust, with stockier limbs and a more square head. The rosettes on a jaguar's coat are larger, darker, fewer in number and have thicker lines, with a small spot in the middle.
It has powerful jaws with the third-highest bite force of all felids, after the tiger and the lion.
It has an average bite force at the canine tip of 887.0 Newton and a bite force quotient at the canine tip of 118.6.

Color variation
Melanistic jaguars are also known as black panthers. The black morph is less common than the spotted one.
Black jaguars have been documented in Central and South America. Melanism in the jaguar is caused by deletions in the melanocortin 1 receptor gene and inherited through a dominant allele.

In 2004, a camera trap in the Sierra Madre Occidental mountains photographed the first documented black jaguar in Northern Mexico. Black jaguars were also photographed in Costa Rica's Alberto Manuel Brenes Biological Reserve, in the mountains of the Cordillera de Talamanca, in Barbilla National Park and in eastern Panama.

Distribution and habitat

In the 19th century, the jaguar was still sighted at the North Platte River in Colorado and coastal Louisiana.
In 1919, sightings of jaguars were reported in the Monterey, California region.
Its present range extends from Mexico through Central America to South America comprising Belize, Guatemala, Honduras, Nicaragua, Costa Rica, particularly on the Osa Peninsula, Panama, Colombia, Venezuela, Guyana, Suriname, French Guiana, Ecuador, Peru, Bolivia, Brazil, Paraguay and Argentina. It is considered to be locally extinct in El Salvador and Uruguay.

Jaguars have been occasionally sighted in Arizona, New Mexico and Texas.
Between 2012 and 2015, a male vagrant jaguar was recorded in 23 locations in the Santa Rita Mountains.

The jaguar prefers dense forest and typically inhabits dry deciduous forests, tropical and subtropical moist broadleaf forests, rainforests and cloud forests in Central and South America; open, seasonally flooded wetlands, dry grassland and historically also oak forests in the United States. It has been recorded at elevations up to  but avoids montane forests. It favors riverine habitat and swamps with dense vegetation cover. In the Mayan forests of Mexico and Guatemala, 11 GPS-collared jaguars preferred undisturbed dense habitat away from roads; females avoided even areas with low levels of human activity, whereas males appeared less disturbed by human population density. A young male jaguar was also recorded in the semi-arid Sierra de San Carlos at a waterhole.

Behavior and ecology
The jaguar is mostly active at night and during twilight.
However, jaguars living in densely forested regions of the Amazon Rainforest and the Pantanal are largely active by day, whereas jaguars in the Atlantic Forest are primarily active by night.
The activity pattern of the jaguar coincides with the activity of its main prey species. Jaguars are good swimmers and play and hunt in the water, possibly more than tigers. They have been recorded moving between islands and the shore. Jaguars are also good at climbing trees but do so less often than cougars.

Ecological role

The adult jaguar is an apex predator, meaning it is at the top of the food chain and is not preyed upon in the wild. The jaguar has also been termed a keystone species, as it is assumed that it controls the population levels of prey such as herbivorous and seed-eating mammals and thus maintains the structural integrity of forest systems.
However, field work has shown this may be natural variability, and the population increases may not be sustained. Thus, the keystone predator hypothesis is not accepted by all scientists.

The jaguar is sympatric with the cougar (Puma concolor). In central Mexico, both prey on white-tailed deer (Odocoileus virginianus), which makes up 54% and 66% of jaguar and cougar's prey, respectively. In northern Mexico, the jaguar and the cougar share the same habitat, and their diet overlaps dependent on prey availability. Jaguars seemed to prefer deer and calves. In Mexico and Central America, neither of the two cats are considered to be the dominant predator.
This situation may be advantageous to the cougar. Its broader prey niche, including its ability to take smaller prey, may give it an advantage over the jaguar in human-altered landscapes.

Hunting and diet

The jaguar is an obligate carnivore and depends solely on flesh for its nutrient requirements. When available, it also preys on marsh deer (Blastocerus dichotomus), southern tamandua (Tamandua tetradactyla), collared peccary (Dicotyles tajacu) and black agouti (Dasyprocta fuliginosa). In floodplains, jaguars opportunistically take reptiles such as turtles and caimans. Consumption of reptiles appears to be more frequent in jaguars than in other big cats. One remote population in the Brazilian Pantanal is recorded to primarily feed on aquatic reptiles and fish.
The jaguar also preys on livestock in cattle ranching areas where wild prey is scarce.

The jaguar's bite force allows it to pierce the carapaces of the yellow-spotted Amazon river turtle (Podocnemis unifilis) and the yellow-footed tortoise (Chelonoidis denticulatus). It employs an unusual killing method: it bites mammalian prey directly through the skull between the ears to deliver a fatal bite to the brain. It kills capybara by piercing its canine teeth through the temporal bones of its skull, breaking its zygomatic arch and mandible and penetrating its brain, often through the ears.
It has been hypothesized to be an adaptation to "cracking open" turtle shells; armored reptiles may have formed an abundant prey base for the jaguar following the late Pleistocene extinctions. However, this is disputed, as even in areas where jaguars prey on reptiles, they are still taken relatively infrequently compared to mammals in spite of their greater abundance.

Between October 2001 and April 2004, 10 jaguars were monitored in the southern Pantanal. In the dry season from April to September, they killed prey at intervals ranging from one to seven days; and ranging from one to 16 days in the wet season from October to March.

The jaguar uses a stalk-and-ambush strategy when hunting rather than chasing prey. The cat will slowly walk down forest paths, listening for and stalking prey before rushing or ambushing. The jaguar attacks from cover and usually from a target's blind spot with a quick pounce; the species' ambushing abilities are considered nearly peerless in the animal kingdom by both indigenous people and field researchers and are probably a product of its role as an apex predator in several different environments. The ambush may include leaping into water after prey, as a jaguar is quite capable of carrying a large kill while swimming; its strength is such that carcasses as large as a heifer can be hauled up a tree to avoid flood levels. After killing prey, the jaguar will drag the carcass to a thicket or other secluded spot. It begins eating at the neck and chest. The heart and lungs are consumed, followed by the shoulders.

Social activity

The jaguar is generally solitary except for females with cubs. In 1977, groups consisting of a male, female and cubs, and two females with two males were sighted several times in a study area in the Paraguay River valley. In some areas, males may form paired coalitions which together mark, defend and invade territories, find and mate with the same females and search for and share prey. The home range of the male in this study area overlapped with several females.

The jaguar uses scrape marks, urine, and feces to mark its territory.
The size of home ranges depends on the level of deforestation and human population density.
Studies employing GPS telemetry in 2003 and 2004 found densities of only six to seven jaguars per 100 km2 in the Pantanal region, compared with 10 to 11 using traditional methods; this suggests the widely used sampling methods may inflate the actual numbers of individuals in a sampling area. Fights between males occur but are rare, and avoidance behavior has been observed in the wild. In one wetland population with degraded territorial boundaries and more social proximity, adults of the same sex are more tolerant of each other and engage in more friendly and co-operative interactions.

The jaguar roars or grunts for long-distance communication; intensive bouts of counter-calling between individuals have been observed in the wild. This vocalization is described as "hoarse" with five or six guttural notes. Chuffing is produced by individuals when greeting, during courting, or by a mother comforting her cubs. This sound is described as low intensity snorts, possibly intended to signal tranquility and passivity. Cubs have been recorded bleating, gurgling and mewing.

Reproduction and life cycle

In captivity, the female jaguar is recorded to reach sexual maturity at the age of about 2.5 years. Estrus lasts 7–15 days with an estrus cycle of 41.8 to 52.6 days. During estrus, she exhibits increased restlessness with rolling and prolonged vocalizations.
She is an induced ovulator but can also ovulate spontaneously.
Gestation lasts 91 to 111 days.
The male is sexually mature at the age of three to four years.
His mean ejaculate volume is 8.6±1.3 ml.
Generation length of the jaguar is 9.8 years.

In the Pantanal, breeding pairs were observed to stay together for up to five days. Females had one to two cubs.
The young are born with closed eyes but open them after two weeks. Cubs are weaned at the age of three months but remain in the birth den for six months before leaving to accompany their mother on hunts.
Jaguars remain with their mothers for up to two years. They appear to rarely live beyond 11 years, but captive individuals may live 22 years.

In 2001, a male jaguar killed and partially consumed two cubs in Emas National Park. DNA paternity testing of blood samples revealed that the male was the father of the cubs. Two more cases of infanticide were documented in the northern Pantanal in 2013. To defend against infanticide, the female may hide her cubs and distract the male with courtship behavior.

Attacks on humans

The Spanish conquistadors feared the jaguar. According to Charles Darwin, the indigenous peoples of South America stated that people did not need to fear the jaguar as long as capybaras were abundant.
The first official record of a jaguar killing a human in Brazil dates to June 2008.
Two children were attacked by jaguars in Guyana.
The jaguar is the least likely of all big cats to kill and eat humans, and the majority of attacks come when it has been cornered or wounded.

Threats

The jaguar is threatened by loss and fragmentation of habitat, illegal killing in retaliation for livestock depredation and for illegal trade in jaguar body parts. It is listed as Near Threatened on the IUCN Red List since 2002, as the jaguar population has probably declined by 20–25% since the mid-1990s. Deforestation is a major threat to the jaguar across its range. Habitat loss was most rapid in drier regions such as the Argentine pampas, the arid grasslands of Mexico and the southwestern United States.

In 2002, it was estimated that the range of the jaguar had declined to about 46% of its range in the early 20th century. In 2018, it was estimated that its range had declined by 55% in the last century. The only remaining stronghold is the Amazon rainforest, a region that is rapidly being fragmented by deforestation.
By 2014, direct linkages between two JCUs in Bolivia were lost, and two JCUs in northern Argentina became completely isolated due to deforestation.

In Mexico, the jaguar is primarily threatened by poaching. Its habitat is fragmented in northern Mexico, in the Gulf of Mexico and the Yucatán Peninsula, caused by changes in land use, construction of roads and tourism infrastructure.
In Panama, 220 of 230 jaguars were killed in retaliation for predation on livestock between 1998 and 2014.
In Venezuela, the jaguar was extirpated in about 26% of its range in the country since 1940, mostly in dry savannas and unproductive scrubland in the northeastern region of Anzoátegui.
In Ecuador, the jaguar is threatened by reduced prey availability in areas where the expansion of the road network facilitated access of human hunters to forests.
In the Alto Paraná Atlantic forests, at least 117 jaguars were killed in Iguaçu National Park and the adjacent Misiones Province between 1995 and 2008.
Some Afro-Colombians in the Colombian Chocó Department hunt jaguars for consumption and sale of meat.
Between 2008 and 2012, at least 15 jaguars were killed by livestock farmers in central Belize.

The international trade of jaguar skins boomed between the end of the Second World War and the early 1970s.
Significant declines occurred in the 1960s, as more than 15,000 jaguars were yearly killed for their skins in the Brazilian Amazon alone; the trade in jaguar skins decreased since 1973 when the Convention on International Trade in Endangered Species was enacted.
Interview surveys with 533 people in the northwestern Bolivian Amazon revealed that local people killed jaguars out of fear, in retaliation, and for trade.
Between August 2016 and August 2019, jaguar skins and body parts were seen for sale in tourist markets in the Peruvian cities of Lima, Iquitos and Pucallpa.
Human-wildlife conflict, opportunistic hunting and hunting for trade in domestic markets are key drivers for killing jaguars in Belize and Guatemala.
Seizure reports indicate that at least 857 jaguars were involved in trade between 2012 and 2018, including 482 individuals in Bolivia alone; 31 jaguars were seized in China.
Between 2014 and early 2019, 760 jaguar fangs were seized that originated in Bolivia and were destined for China. Undercover investigations revealed that the smuggling of jaguar body parts is run by Chinese residents in Bolivia.

Conservation
The jaguar is listed on CITES Appendix I, which means that all international commercial trade in jaguars or their body parts is prohibited. Hunting jaguars is prohibited in Argentina, Brazil, Colombia, French Guiana, Honduras, Nicaragua, Panama, Paraguay, Suriname, the United States, and Venezuela. Hunting jaguars is restricted in Guatemala and Peru. In Ecuador, hunting jaguars is prohibited, and it is classified as threatened with extinction.
In Guyana, it is protected as an endangered species, and hunting it is illegal.

In 1986, the Cockscomb Basin Wildlife Sanctuary was established in Belize as the world's first protected area for jaguar conservation.

Jaguar Conservation Units
In 1999, field scientists from 18 jaguar range countries determined the most important areas for long-term jaguar conservation based on the status of jaguar population units, stability of prey base and quality of habitat.
 the Sierra Madre Occidental and Sierra de Tamaulipas in Mexico
 the Selva Maya tropical forests extending over Mexico, Belize and Guatemala
 the Chocó–Darién moist forests from Honduras and Panama to Colombia
 Venezuelan Llanos
 northern Cerrado and Amazon basin in Brazil
 Tropical Andes in Bolivia and Peru
 Misiones Province in Argentina

Optimal routes of travel between core jaguar population units were identified across its range in 2010 to implement wildlife corridors that connect JCUs. These corridors represent areas with the shortest distance between jaguar breeding populations, require the least possible energy input of dispersing individuals and pose a low mortality risk.
Cooperation with local landowners and municipal, state, or federal agencies is essential to maintain connected populations and prevent fragmentation in both JCUs and corridors.
The other corridors may hamper passage, as they are narrower and longer.

In August 2012, the United States Fish and Wildlife Service set aside  in Arizona and New Mexico for the protection of the jaguar. The Jaguar Recovery Plan was published in April 2019, in which Interstate 10 is considered to form the northern boundary of the Jaguar Recovery Unit in Arizona and New Mexico.

In Mexico, a national conservation strategy was developed from 2005 on and published in 2016. The Mexican jaguar population increased from an estimated 4,000 individuals in 2010 to about 4,800 individuals in 2018. This increase is seen as a positive effect of conservation measures that were implemented in cooperation with governmental and non-governmental institutions and landowners.

An evaluation of JCUs from Mexico to Argentina revealed that they overlap with high-quality habitats of about 1,500 mammals to varying degrees. Since co-occurring mammals benefit from the JCU approach, the jaguar has been called an umbrella species.
Central American JCUs overlap with the habitat of 187 of 304 regional endemic amphibian and reptile species, of which 19 amphibians occur only in the jaguar range.

Approaches

In setting up protected reserves, efforts generally also have to be focused on the surrounding areas, as jaguars are unlikely to confine themselves to the bounds of a reservation, especially if the population is increasing in size. Human attitudes in the areas surrounding reserves and laws and regulations to prevent poaching are essential to make conservation areas effective.

To estimate population sizes within specific areas and to keep track of individual jaguars, camera trapping and wildlife tracking telemetry are widely used, and feces are sought out with the help of detection dogs to study jaguar health and diet.

Current conservation efforts often focus on educating ranch owners and promoting ecotourism. Ecotourism setups are being used to generate public interest in charismatic animals such as the jaguar while at the same time generating revenue that can be used in conservation efforts. A key concern in jaguar ecotourism is the considerable habitat space the species requires. If ecotourism is used to aid in jaguar conservation, some considerations need to be made as to how existing ecosystems will be kept intact, or how new ecosystems will be put into place that are large enough to support a growing jaguar population.

In culture and mythology

In the pre-Columbian Americas, the jaguar was a symbol of power and strength. In the Andes, a jaguar cult disseminated by the early Chavín culture became accepted over most of today's Peru by 900 BC. The later Moche culture in northern Peru used the jaguar as a symbol of power in many of their ceramics. In the Muisca religion in Altiplano Cundiboyacense, the jaguar was considered a sacred animal, and people dressed in jaguar skins during religious rituals.
The skins were traded with peoples in the nearby Orinoquía Region.
The name of the Muisca ruler Nemequene was derived from the Chibcha words nymy and quyne, meaning "force of the jaguar".

Sculptures with "Olmec were-jaguar" motifs were found on the Yucatán Peninsula in Veracruz and Tabasco; they show stylized jaguars with half-human faces. In the later Maya civilization, the jaguar was believed to facilitate communication between the living and the dead and to protect the royal household. The Maya saw these powerful felines as their companions in the spiritual world, and several Maya rulers bore names that incorporated the Mayan word for jaguar b'alam in many of the Mayan languages. Balam remains a common Maya surname, and it is also the name of Chilam Balam, a legendary author to whom are attributed 17th and 18th-centuries Maya miscellanies preserving much important knowledge. Remains of jaguar bones were discovered in a burial site in Guatemala, which indicates that Mayans may have kept jaguars as pets.

The Aztec civilization shared this image of the jaguar as the representative of the ruler and as a warrior. The Aztecs formed an elite warrior class known as the Jaguar warrior. In Aztec mythology, the jaguar was considered to be the totem animal of the powerful deities Tezcatlipoca and Tepeyollotl.

A conch shell gorget depicting a jaguar was found in a burial mound in Benton County, Missouri. The gorget shows evenly-engraved lines and measures .
Rock drawings made by the Hopi, Anasazi and Pueblo all over the desert and chaparral regions of the American Southwest show an explicitly spotted cat, presumably a jaguar, as it is drawn much larger than an ocelot.

The jaguar is also used as a symbol in contemporary culture. It is the national animal of Guyana and is featured in its coat of arms.
The flag of the Department of Amazonas features a black jaguar silhouette leaping towards a hunter.
The crest of the Argentine Rugby Union features a jaguar.

See also
 List of largest cats

References

External links

 
 
 People and Jaguars a Guide for Coexistence
 Felidae Conservation Fund
 

 
Apex predators
Big cats
ESA endangered species
Fauna of the Amazon
Fauna of the Cerrado
Fauna of the Pantanal
Fauna of the Southwestern United States
Felids of Central America
Felids of North America
Felids of South America
Mammals described in 1758
Near threatened animals
Near threatened biota of South America
Near threatened biota of North America
onca
Taxa named by Carl Linnaeus